Sri Lanka competed at the 2022 World Aquatics Championships in Budapest, Hungary from 17 June to 3 July.

Open water swimming

Sri Lanka qualified one male and one female open water swimmers.

Men

Women

Swimming

Sri Lanka entered four swimmers.

Men

Women

References

Nations at the 2022 World Aquatics Championships
2022 in Sri Lankan sport
Sri Lanka at the World Aquatics Championships